The discography of Japanese pop singer Bonnie Pink consists of twelve studio albums, three compilation albums, one live album, two extended plays one soundtrack and forty-two singles.

Studio albums

Compilation albums

Cover and remake albums

Extended plays

Soundtrack

Remix albums

Live albums

Singles

As a lead artist

As a featured artist

Promotional singles

Other appearances

Video albums

Notes

References

Discographies of Japanese artists
Pop music discographies